is an Autobahn in Germany. It connects the A 38 and Erfurt to the A 70 near Schweinfurt. A further northern extension to the A 14 near Plötzkau has been proposed by the state government of Sachsen-Anhalt.

Construction on the A 71, supervised by DEGES, began in 1996, most parts were being opened by December 2005. The project was completed in September 2015.

Exit list

 

 
 

 

 

 

|}

Characteristics

Buildings at Thuringian forest 
While crossing the Thuringian Forest are a lot of large engineering works needed, the most notable are listed in the table below.

Records 
 Wilde Gera viaduct: with  span length the largest Arch bridge in Germany, convicted by a street
 Rennsteig Tunnel: with  the longest Tunnel in Germany, and the fourth longest Tunnel with two parallel tubes in Europe

Gallery

Notes

External links 

71
A071
A071
A071